The Jiménez Municipality is one of the nine municipalities (municipios) that makes up the Venezuelan state of Lara and, according to a 2007 population estimate by the National Institute of Statistics of Venezuela, the municipality has a population of 97,524.  The town of Quíbor is the shire town of the Jiménez Municipality.

Demographics
The Jiménez Municipality, according to a 2011 population estimate by the National Institute of Statistics of Venezuela, has a population of 100,997 (up from 97,524 in 2007). This amounts to 5.6% of the state's population.

Government
The mayor of the Jiménez Municipality is Luis Alberto Plaza Paz, elected on October 31, 2004, with 73% of the vote.   He replaced Manuel Diaz shortly after the elections.  The municipality is divided into eight parishes; Juan Bautista Rodríguez, Cuara, Diego de Lozada, Paraíso de San José, San Miguel, Tintorero, José Bernardo Dorante, and Coronel.

See also
Quíbor
Lara
Municipalities of Venezuela

References

External links
jimenez-lara.gob.ve 

Municipalities of Lara (state)